Brutale (Guillermo Barrera) is a DC Comics supervillain. He first appeared in Nightwing vol. 2 #22 and was created by Chuck Dixon and Scott McDaniel.

Fictional character biography
Brutale was a top-level interrogator/torturer for the secret police in the fictional Latin American country of Hasaragua, until a revolution forced him to flee. In Hasaragua, Guillermo Barrera served the secret police of his government as a savage interrogator, extracting confessions efficiently with blades and tools used for surgery. When the Marxist regime of Hasaragua fell, Barrera escaped the country to America, fleeing execution for the atrocities he committed.

Adopting the name Brutale, Barrera put his 'Surgical Skills' to use as a hired assassin. He eventually began working for Blockbuster in Blüdhaven while donning a costume that resembles a gargoyle. He battled against Nightwing on several occasions.

In the Infinite Crisis storyline, Brutale was among the villains that joined Alexander Luthor, Jr.'s Secret Society of Super Villains.

In the Salvation Run storyline, Brutale was among the supervillains exiled to another planet. When the Parademons under Desaad's command attacked the camp, Brutale was stabbed by one of them. However, he was seen alive in the new Secret Six mini-series.

Brutale is featured in one issue of the Red Robin series. He is listed as one of the targets of Tim Drake-Wayne/Red Robin for his "Hit List". Red Robin catches him at a bar, attempting to terrorize the owners into paying fees due to a gang boss. He is accompanied by what Red Robin assumes is his 'girlfriend', who manages to escape as Red Robin takes Brutale down using his Escrima sticks.

In The New 52, Brutale is reintroduced in the first issue of Blue Beetle where he appears to be working for La Dama's group who are attempting to steal the scarab.

Powers and abilities
Brutale has no superhuman powers, but is an expert with all forms of knives and blades, being able to both fight superbly and inflict horrible pain on his victims. He has a variety of scalpels, throwing knives and other razor keen blades that he utilizes.

In other media
 Guillermo Barrera appears in the Arrow'''s first season episode "Dead to Rights", portrayed by George Tchortov. He is hired by China White to assassinate Malcolm Merlyn, despite having been involved with Merlyn's planned "Undertaking". Oliver Queen intercepts him as he arrives in Starling City and after a brief struggle, stabs Barrera in the chest with an arrow, and takes his phone. Guillermo does not wear a costume and the name Brutale is never mentioned, but he is an expert knifethrower.
 Brutale appears in Superman/Batman: Public Enemies, where he is among the super villains trying to collect the bounty on Superman and Batman's head.
 Barrera is mentioned in the 2015 video game Batman: Arkham Knight'' by one of militia soldiers who did work for him back in Hasaragua.

References

External links
 Brutale's Bio

DC Comics male supervillains
Comics characters introduced in 1998
Fictional assassins in comics
Fictional blade and dart throwers
Fictional knife-fighters
Characters created by Chuck Dixon
Batman characters